Edvard Amundsen (January 27, 1873 – December 21, 1928) was a Norwegian Lutheran missionary in China and India near the borders of Tibet. He is also remembered as an explorer and Tibetan specialist.

Biography 
Amundsen was born in Lille Kirkeholmen in the Municipality of Sannidal. In 1894, he journeyed to India as part of Annie Royle Taylor's Tibetan Pioneer Mission, which would fail within a year. In 1896, together with Theo Sørensen, he traveled to Darjeeling and Kalimpong in the Himalayas near the borders of Tibet as a missionary for the China Inland Mission, where he studied Tibetan religion and customs. After their language studies Amundsen attempted to travel from there to Lhasa in Tibet but was halted eight days journey short of the "forbidden city."  Later the two of them went to Kangding (Szechwan), China in the foothills of the Tibetan plateau to the west. His wife Petrea Ness (1862–1928), from Mandal, Norway, was also a missionary and accompanied him on his trips to China and Tibet.

During the Boxer Rebellion in 1900 he left China for Darjeeling, but in 1903 he returned and then worked in Yunnan for the British and Foreign Bible Society until 1911. From 1918/19 to 1924 he served in China for the last time for the Mission Covenant Church of Norway.

He died in Larvik. A species of rhododendron is named after him: Rhododendron amundsenianum.

Selected works
Primer of Standard Tibetan (Darjeeling, 1903)
In the Land of the Lamas: The Story of Trashilhamo (novel; London, 1910)
Tibetan Manual, with Vocabulary (by Vincent E. Henderson, edited by Amundsen; Calcutta, 1903)

See also 
 Christianity in Tibet
 Protestantism in Sichuan

References

1873 births
1928 deaths
People from Kragerø
Norwegian expatriates in China
Lutheran missionaries in China
Protestant missionaries in Tibet
Protestant missionaries in Sichuan
Tibetologists
Linguists from Norway
Norwegian Lutheran missionaries
Missionary linguists